William Craw Webb (April 21, 1824 – April 19, 1898) was an American lawyer, politician and judge.  He was a member of the Wisconsin State Assembly and the Kansas House of Representatives, a Kansas District Court Judge, and a Union Army officer in the American Civil War.

Biography
Webb was born in Ridgebury Township, Bradford County, Pennsylvania, on April 21, 1824, son of John L. and Annis (Hammond) Webb.  Later, he was a resident of Wautoma, Wisconsin. He died on April 24, 1898, in Topeka, Kansas.

Political career
Webb was Chief Clerk of the Wisconsin Assembly for the 1857 session, when his brother, Henry, was a member.  In the fall general election that year, he was elected to succeed his brother as a member of the Assembly for the 1858 session.  He was elected again to serve in the 1862, 1863 and 1864 sessions. He served a term as Speaker. Previously, he had been Chief Clerk of the Assembly in 1857. Webb was also District Attorney and Judge of Waushara County, Wisconsin.

In 1870, Webb was a Kansas District Court judge. From 1871 to 1873, he was the first Kansas State Superintendents of Insurance. Webb was a member of the House of Representatives from 1870 to 1871 before being re-elected in 1891. Additionally, he was Attorney and Superior Court Judge of Shawnee County, Kansas.

Webb's affiliation by the time he held office was with the Republican Party.

Military career
Webb was initially assigned to the 37th Wisconsin Volunteer Infantry Regiment of the Union Army during the American Civil War. He was later commissioned Colonel of the 52nd Wisconsin Infantry Regiment, but was never mustered into federal service at that rank, because the regiment did not reach its full strength. He was a Companion of the Kansas Commandery of the Military Order of the Loyal Legion of the United States.

Family
Webb's son Leland Justin Webb, was a lawyer and politician.  His brothers, Henry and Charles were also active in politics and law in Wisconsin and Kansas.

References

External links

People from Bradford County, Pennsylvania
People from Wautoma, Wisconsin
Politicians from Topeka, Kansas
Republican Party members of the Wisconsin State Assembly
Republican Party members of the Kansas House of Representatives
District attorneys in Wisconsin
Wisconsin state court judges
Kansas lawyers
Kansas state court judges
Kansas Insurance Commissioners
People of Wisconsin in the American Civil War
Union Army colonels
1824 births
1898 deaths
19th-century American politicians
19th-century American judges
19th-century American lawyers
People buried in Topeka Cemetery
Military personnel from Pennsylvania